William Harry Price (born 4 December 1859) was an English cricketer who played two first-class matches for Liverpool and District in 1889. He was born in Ruddington, Nottinghamshire.

Both his games were at Aigburth in Liverpool. In the first, against Yorkshire, he made 26* and 1* and took 3-52 (including the wicket of George Ulyett) in an innings defeat. In the second, against Nottinghamshire, he made only 0 and 1 with the bat, but took 6–51 in the first innings and a further wicket in the second despite Nottinghamshire's nine-wicket victory.

Three of Price's relatives played first-class cricket: his father Walter appeared more than 30 times for a variety of teams, most notably Marylebone Cricket Club (MCC) and Nottinghamshire, while his brother Alfred played briefly for Lancashire and Nottinghamshire, and another brother (Frederick) had a solitary outing for North of England.

External links
 

1859 births
Year of death missing
English cricketers
People from Ruddington
Cricketers from Nottinghamshire
Liverpool and District cricketers